For the fiction character see Pendragon: Journal of an Adventure through Time and Space

Elaine Winter (born 31 Dec 1895) was a figure skater who competed for Germany at the 1928 Winter Olympics.

References 

Olympic figure skaters of Germany
Figure skaters at the 1928 Winter Olympics
1895 births
Year of death missing
German female single skaters